The National Center for Parasitology, Entomology and Malaria Control (CNM) is a government agency responsible for directing and supervising the control of vector-borne disease in Cambodia.  In conjunction with disease control the Center creates health education programs and manages scientific research projects. It is governed by the Ministry of Health.  Main offices of the Center are located in Phnom Penh; the Center Director is Dr. Doung Socheat.

Focus areas 
The Center has four principal disease targets:
 Malaria
 DHF - Dengue haemorrhagic fever
 Filariasis and schistosomiasis
 Intestinal parasitic infections

Sanction and affiliation
Internationally, the Center works with the World Health Organization, World Bank, European Commission, USAID, JICA, IFRC and many others.  Domestically, the Center works with the Ministry of Health, Ministry of National Defence, Ministry of Education, Youth and Sport, and others.

See also
Government of Cambodia
Health in Cambodia

External links
 
 The Asian Liver Fluke Network, 'Founders of the Liver Fluke Network'
 Large-scale malaria survey in Cambodia: Novel insights on species distribution and risk factors, peer review abstract of CNM-affiliated research at PubMed
 Ministry of Health, homepage

References

Medical and health organisations based in Cambodia
Cambodia
Government agencies of Cambodia